Leiopython is a genus of snakes in the family Pythonidae.

Species
The genus Leiopython contains the following species:
D’Albertis' python, northern white-lipped python, L. albertisii 
Karimui Basin white-lipped python, southern white-lipped python, L. fredparkeri 
Biak white-lipped python, L. biakensis

Description
They are patternless, except the northern white-lipped python has some light markings on its postoculars, which are absent in the southern whitelip python.

Behavior
Although mostly terrestrial, these snakes can and are known to occasionally climb. White-lipped pythons are reportedly aggressive, though this is reduced in those born and raised in captivity. These snakes have also been observed to regularly regurgitate fur balls from their prey.

Nota bene: A binomial authority in parentheses indicates that the species was originally described in a genus other than Leiopython.

References

Snake genera
Pythonidae